Thomas Basset (died c. 1182) was a 12th-century English judge.

Life
Basset was the son of Gilbert Basset (presumably a son of Ralph Basset, the justiciar). He received a grant of the lordship of Hedendon, Oxfordshire, for services in war, and served as Sheriff of Oxfordshire from 1163 to 1164. In 1167–8 he was an itinerant justice for Essex and Hertfordshire, and in 1169 he became a baron of the exchequer, a post he held to c. 1181. In 1175 he was again an itinerant justice and in close attendance on the court, as he continued to be until 1181. Basset was specially named as a justice itinerant on one of the new circuits on 10 April 1179. He married Adeliza Basset and their children were Gilbert, Thomas and Alan and Alice who married William Malet. He is last mentioned in August 1181, and at the close of 1182 he had been succeeded by his son Gilbert.

References

Year of birth missing
1182 deaths
12th-century English judges
Holders of the Honour of Wallingford
High Sheriffs of Oxfordshire